The canton of Charly-sur-Marne is a former administrative division in northern France. It was disbanded following the French canton reorganisation which came into effect in March 2015. It consisted of 19 communes, which joined the new canton of Essômes-sur-Marne in 2015. It had 14,881 inhabitants (2012).

The canton comprised the following communes:

Bézu-le-Guéry
La Chapelle-sur-Chézy
Charly-sur-Marne
Chézy-sur-Marne
Coupru
Crouttes-sur-Marne
Domptin
L'Épine-aux-Bois
Essises
Lucy-le-Bocage
Montfaucon
Montreuil-aux-Lions
Nogent-l'Artaud
Pavant
Romeny-sur-Marne
Saulchery
Vendières
Viels-Maisons
Villiers-Saint-Denis

Demographics

See also
Cantons of the Aisne department

References

Former cantons of Aisne
2015 disestablishments in France
States and territories disestablished in 2015